Cuanhama, also known as Kwanhama, is a municipality in Cunene Province, Angola. Cuanhama occupies 20,255 square kilometers and has 374,529 inhabitants . It is bordered to the north by the municipality of Cuvelai, east by the municipality of Menongue, the south by the municipality of Namacunde, and west by the municipality of Ombadja. Ondjiva, the administrative capital of Cunene Province, is located in Cuanhama. Other communes in Cuanhama include Môngua, Evale, Nehone and Tchimporo-Yonde.

Demographics
The municipality of Cuanhama recorded high population growth in recent years and is currently the most populous in the whole province of Cunene.

References

Municipalities of Angola
Populated places in Cunene Province